Wilhelm Carl Melchior Simmler (6 September 1840 – 8 December 1923) was a German painter and illustrator of the Düsseldorf school of painting.

Family 
Born in Geisenheim, Simmler was one of nine children of the painter  (1801–1872).

Life 
Simmler was born in the Rheingau. From 1856 to 1861 he studied at the Kunstakademie Düsseldorf. There, he was a student of Emil Hünten, Karl Ferdinand Sohn, Friedrich Wilhelm von Schadow, Christian Köhler and Eduard Bendemann, among others. After intermediate stays in Munich from 1861 to 1863, he mainly stayed in Düsseldorf from 1869 onwards. His private pupil from 1871 to 1875 was the British genre painter Walter Dendy Sadler. Simmler was a member of the Malkasten. After several commissions, including in Hamburg and Berlin, he finally moved to Berlin in 1891, where he remained a member of the Verein Berliner Künstler until his death.

Work 

He stood out especially for his history painting, genre painting and hunting motifs, which marked him out as a successful artist even during his lifetime. From 1862, he was represented at exhibitions in Berlin, Düsseldorf and Berlin. In later years, he painted panoramas and mural paintings. In 1883, the panorama was removed and later still shown in Cologne and Hamburg. This was followed in 1882 by the Orient Panorama "Entry of the Mecca Caravan into Cairo" by Simmler and Themistokles von Eckenbrecher (118 × 15 metres) for the city of Hamburg. For the Ruhmeshalle Berlin he completed around 1891, he produced the mural Übergang über das Kurische Haff vom 19. Januar 1679, which was destroyed by a bomb hit during the Second World War in 1944.

Simmler also produced illustrations for children's and youth books such as the originals of the colour prints for an edition of The Adventures of Baron von Münchhausen by Gottfried August Bürger.

References

Further reading 
 
 
  (ed.): Lexikon der Düsseldorfer Malerschule 1819–1918. Vol. 3: Nabert–Zwecker. Published by the Kunstmuseum Düsseldorf im Ehrenhof and Galerie Paffrath. Bruckmann, Munich 1998, .
 Matthias Lehmann: Friedrich Simmler (1801–1872). Leben und Werk des Malers aus Geisenheim. Fichter, Frankfurt 2012, .

External links 

 Wilhelm Simmler, short biography on Galerie Paffrath
 Wilhelm Simmler (deutsch, 1840–1914). Artnet.de

19th-century German painters
19th-century German male artists
20th-century German painters
20th-century German male artists
German landscape painters
German genre painters
German history painters
German illustrators
1840 births
1923 deaths
People from Rheingau-Taunus-Kreis